John Davies (1823 - 1874) was a Welsh Methodist minister. He was born in Llandovery, and as a young boy attended a school in Myddfai for a while before moving to attend classes at Hanover School, near Abergavenny. In 1842, he began a period of study at Brecon College, following which, as an ordained minister, he held appointments at; Llanelly, Brecknock (1846), Aberaman (1854), Mount Stuart, Cardiff (1863), and Hannah Street, Cardiff (1868–74).

His written works include a booklet (to counteract the influence of the Mormons in Wales), 'Y Doniau Gwyrthiol' (1851). He was an editor of 'Y Beirniad', and also participated in the establishment of 'Yr Adolygydd' (1850).

He died in May 1874, and was buried in Cardiff cemetery.

References 

1823 births
1874 deaths
19th-century Welsh Methodist ministers
19th-century Welsh writers
People from Llandovery